Aymavilles is a town and comune in the Aosta Valley region of northwestern Italy.

References

Cities and towns in Aosta Valley